Mar Youhannan Semaan Issayi (1914 -یوحنا سمعان عیسائی)  ;1999)) was the  Metropolitan Archbishop of Tehran of the Chaldean Catholics from March 16, 1971, until his death on February 7, 1999. He was born in Sanandaj سنندج, Kurdistan Iran on June 27, 1914, and ordained priest on March 3, 1940, and consecrated bishop on, October 22, 1967, in Iran.

Additional titles
Coadjutor Archbishop of Sehna of the Chaldeans (Iran): (September 1, 1967 – March 7, 1970)
Titular Archbishop of Hieropolis: (September 1, 1967 – March 7, 1970)
Metropolitan Archbishop of Sehna of the Chaldeans (Iran): (March 7, 1970 – March 16, 1971.

Education
His Excellency attended the Chaldean  Seminary in Mosul for the formation and left for Rome in 1933. He attended the Pontifical Urbaniana University, where he earned a master's degree in both philosophy and theology. He then pursued doctoral studies and obtained his Ph.D. During his academic career, he mastered 8 languages: the classic Syriac, Colloquial Syriac 
(Modern Assyrian), Persian, Arabic, English, French, Italian, Latin, and Kurdish.

Priesthood life 
He was ordained as a priest in 1940 and elevated to the rank of Archbishop on October 22, 1967. His excellency Metropolitan Mar Youhannan Semaan Issayi for more than half-century dedicated his life and earnestly served the Assyro-Chaldean Catholic Congregation at Tehran, Hamadan, Kermanshah, Qazvin, and Sanandaj. He supervised several construction projects of the churches, schools, and other charity institutions affiliated to the Assyro-Chaldean Catholic Church at Tehran Diocese.

Writer and translator 
Translation of Eastern Rite Mass book from Aramaic into Modern Colloquial Syriac.  A writer of extensively religious or Historic issues in modern Assyrian including an unpublished comprehensive Syriac Dictionary. The writer of different religious books for Assyro-Chaldean students from elementary to high school levels. Mar Youhannan was editor of the church's periodicals named Marga and Payam published in Persian and modern Assyro-Chaldean. Mar Youhannan published a poetry book devoted to the Virgin Mary and besides of his clergy services, he was a professor of Aramaic and Assyrian language.

Hymnist 

Mar Youhannan composed many Assyro-Chaldean hymns (music & lyric) for the Christmas Mass, Good Friday, and Easter Mass. These hymns were harmonized in polyphonic by Maestro Paulus Khofri and performed by the Saint Joseph's Church Choir of Tehran and other church choirs worldwide.

External links
http://www.catholic-hierarchy.org/bishop/bissayi.html
http://www.gcatholic.org/dioceses/diocese/tehr0.htm#10223
http://banipal.org/modules.php?name=Content&pa=showpage&pid=127

 Iranian bishops
 Chaldean archbishops
 Iranian Eastern Catholics
 People from Sanandaj
 People from Tehran
1914 births
1999 deaths
 Iranian Assyrian people